Robert Warrior (born 1963, Osage), is a scholar and Hall Distinguished Professor of American Literature and Culture at the University of Kansas. With Paul Chaat Smith, he co-authored Like a Hurricane: The Indian Movement from Alcatraz to Wounded Knee. He is generally recognized, along with Craig Womack, as being one of the founders of American Indian literary nationalism. Warrior served as president of the American Studies Association from 2016 to 2017.

Early life and education 
Robert Allen Warrior was born in Marion County, Kansas, in 1963. Warrior belongs to the Grayhorse District of the Osage Nation.
 
He earned a bachelor's degree in speech communication from Pepperdine University, a master's degree in religion from Yale University, and a doctoral degree in systematic theology from Union Theological Seminary in New York City.

Career 
In 1999, Warrior taught at Cornell University. Warrior previously taught at Stanford University, the University of Oklahoma, and the University of Illinois. He has served as president of the American Studies Association (ASA) and helped found the Native American and Indigenous Studies Association (NAISA).

Honors 
In 2018, the American Academy of Arts and Sciences inducted Warrior.

Publications
The People and the Word: Reading Native Nonfiction (University of Minnesota Press, 2006) , part of the Indigenous Americas series
with Paul Chaat Smith, Like a Hurricane: The Indian Movement from Alcatraz to Wounded Knee (The New Press, 1996) 
Tribal Secrets: Recovering American Indian Intellectual Traditions (University of Minnesota Press, 1994) 
 Canaanites, cowboys, and Indians Union Seminary Quarterly Review, 59(1-2), 1–8.
 co-author of American Indian Literary Nationalism (University of New Mexico Press, 2008)
 co-author of Reasoning Together: the Native Critics Collective (University of Oklahoma Press, 2009).

References

External links
Publisher webpage for Like a Hurricane 

University of Oklahoma faculty
Native American academics
Native American writers
Osage people
Living people
1963 births